Are You Ready? is the first single by In Case of Fire which was to be released on their second album. The song was released June 7, 2010 on their bandcamp-site, for a free download. The single gained airplay on Radio 1, in both Nick Grimshaw and Zane Lowe's shows. No music video was planned for the single.

Track listing

 "Are You Ready?" - 3:32
 "What Are We Fighting For?" - 4:00

Personnel
 Steven Robinson - Vocals, Guitar
 Mark Williamson - Bass guitar
 Colin Robinson - Drums, Percussion

References

External links
 - In Case of Fire's bandcamp site

2010 singles
2010 songs